3,4-Methylenedioxyphenmetrazine is a recreational designer drug with stimulant effects. It is a substituted phenylmorpholine derivative, closely related to better known drugs such as phenmetrazine and 3-fluorophenmetrazine. It has been identified as a synthetic impurity formed in certain routes of MDMA manufacture.

See also 
 3-Chlorophenmetrazine
 MDMAR
 MDPV
 Methylone

References 

Substituted amphetamines
Phenylmorpholines
Designer drugs
Benzodioxoles